Vanessa Mendoza Cortés (born 1980) is a human rights activist and psychologist from Andorra. She is the president of Stop Violències, an organisation that campaigns against gender-based violence and campaigns for the decriminalisation of abortion in Andorra.

Career 
Mendoza's career began as a psychologist in Barcelona, however in 2012 she returned to Andorra. In 2014 she founded and became president of Stop Violències, an organisation that campaigns against gender based violence and campaigns for the decriminalisation of abortion in Andorra. In 2018 Mendoza organised the first Andorran street protest, calling for the decriminalisation of abortion. She has been threatened with physical and sexual violence in response to her activism.

In 2019 the government of Andorra filed a lawsuit against Mendoza, opening a defamation case against her. In 2019 she had spoken on television about the lack of abortion rights in her country presented a report on them to the United Nations Committee on the Elimination of Discrimination against Women (UN CEDAW). In December 2020 Mendoza's lawyer formally requested that the charges be dropped, but was denied. In February 2021 Amnesty International called for the case against Mendoza to be dropped. The Observatory for the Protection of Human Rights Defenders also called for the case to be dropped. It was reopened by a judge at the Andorra la Vella courthouse, where a dozen activists had gathered in support of Mendoza.

References

External links 
 Stop Violències

1980 births
Living people
Andorran activists
Abortion-rights activists
Women human rights activists
Women psychologists